Robert D. Stolorow (born 1942) is a psychoanalyst and philosopher, known for his works on intersubjectivity theory, post-Cartesian psychoanalysis, and emotional trauma. Important books include: Faces in a Cloud (1979, 1993), Structures of Subjectivity (1984, 2014), Psychoanalytic Treatment: An Intersubjective Approach (1987), Contexts of Being (1992), Working Intersubjectively (1997), Worlds of Experience (2002), Trauma and Human Existence (2007), and World, Affectivity, Trauma: Heidegger and Post-Cartesian Psychoanalysis (2011).

Awards
2012: Hans W. Loewald Memorial Award from the International Forum for Psychoanalytic Education

Publications
Stolorow, R. D. & Atwood, G. E. (1979, 1993). Faces in a Cloud: Subjectivity in Personality Theory. Northvale, NJ: Jason Aronson.
Atwood, G. E. & Stolorow, R. D. (1984, 2014). Structures of Subjectivity: Explorations in Psychoanalytic Phenomenology and Contextualism. London & New York: Routledge.
Stolorow, R. D., Brandchaft, B., & Atwood, G. E. (1987). Psychoanalytic Treatment: An Intersubjective Approach. Hillsdale, NJ: Analytic Press.
Stolorow, R. D. & Atwood, G. E. (1992). Contexts of Being: The Intersubjective Foundations of Psychological Life. Hillsdale, NJ: Analytic Press.
Orange, D. M., Atwood, G. E., & Stolorow, R. D. (1997). Working Intersubjectively: Contextualism in Psychoanalytic Practice. Hillsdale, NJ: Analytic Press.
Stolorow, R. D., Atwood, G. E., & Orange, D. M. (2002). Worlds of Experience: Interweaving Philosophical and Clinical Dimensions in Psychoanalysis. New York: Basic Books.
Stolorow, R. D. (2007). Trauma and Human Existence: Autobiographical, Psychoanalytic, and Philosophical Reflections. New York: Routledge.
Stolorow, R. D. (2011). World, Affectivity, Trauma: Heidegger and Post-Cartesian Psychoanalysis. New York: Routledge.

References

External links
 Interview by Figure/Ground Communication

Living people
21st-century American psychologists
American psychoanalysts
Jewish psychoanalysts
Relational psychoanalysts
American philosophers
1942 births
20th-century American psychologists